Le Miroir (literally the mirror in French) may refer to:

 Le Miroir, Saône-et-Loire, a French commune
 List of Wild Cards characters#Le Miroir, a character of the Wild Cards book series
 [[Le Miroir (magazine)|Le Miroir (magazine)]], a 1910s weekly supplement of the Le Petit Parisien'' 
 Le Miroir (newspaper), a newspaper published during the French Revolution

See also
Le Miroir à deux faces
Le Miroir de l'eau
Le miroir de Cassandre